Muhib Ali Uttar, is a town and union council of Okara District in the Punjab province of Pakistan. It is part of Depalpur Tehsil.
It is located at 30°25'0N 73°37'0E with an altitude of 159 metres (524 feet). The estimate terrain elevation above sea level is 168 metres.

References

Union councils of Okara District